The Moran are an ethnic group found in the northeast Indian state of Assam and Arunachal Pradesh. They are mainly concentrated in the districts of Upper Assam and adjoining districts of Arunachal Pradesh. They are of Tibeto-Burman origin and belong to the Bodo Kachari family. They speak Assamese language, though they used to speak Moran language which was alive till the early 20th century that was closely related to the Dimasa language.They once shared the same allied customs with other Bodo-Kachari groups but after their conversion to Vaishnavism, the customs began to diminish but still those customs can be seen intermixed with Vaishnavism. They were among the first peoples who were initiated into Ekasarana dharma by Aniruddhadev in the 17th century.

History
The Moran community is one of the aboriginal tribes of Assam. In the 13th century they lived in the south eastern corner of the Brahmaputra valley occupying territories between the Disang and Dihing rivers. The Morans have a long history in the north–eastern part of India. They had their own independent chiefdom before the advent of the Ahoms. The origin of the word Moran is still remains obscure. According to the British reports the Morans are a distinct tribe inhabiting the jungle, which is, a division of upper Assam.

They had an chiefdom led by chief Bodousa before the advent of the Ahom king Sukaphaa. Having arrived in this affluent kingdom, Sukaphaa proposed to marry princess Gondheswari- the daughter of Moran chief Bodousa. The chief Bodousa accepted his proposal and thus the Moran's became a part of the newly created Ahom polity. Due to their close relation with the Ahoms, the Morans seem to have  adopted many of the  Ahom rites and rituals.

They were also known by the name Habungiya or Hasa where Ha means soil or Earth in Moran language and Sa means son and Habungiya or Hasa means "Son of the soil".

See also
 Moamoria (Matak)
 Moamoria rebellion

Notes

References

Printed sources

 
 
 

History of Assam
Assamese nationalism
Social groups of Assam
 Bodo-Kachari